Ubique is Latin for "everywhere", and may refer to:
 Omnipresence, the property of being present everywhere - commonly used in a religious context.
 Ubique (company).
 Ubique (poem), by Rudyard Kipling.
 Ubique (publication), by the American Geographical Society

and is the motto of:
Foreign Affairs magazine
Royal Regiment of Artillery of the British Army
Corps of Royal Engineers of the British Army
Royal Canadian Artillery of the Canadian Army
Royal Australian Artillery of the Australian Army
Royal Australian Engineers of the Australian Army
Canadian Military Engineers of the Canadian Army
Sri Lanka Engineers of the Sri Lanka Army
 South African Artillery
Royal New Zealand Artillery
Royal New Zealand Engineers

See also 
 Pelagibacter ubique, a ubiquitous marine microorganism
 Ubik, novel by Philip K. Dick